St. Xavier's School, Behror is a private Catholic primary and secondary school located in Behror, Rajasthan, India. The school was established in 1991 by Delhi province of Society of Jesus. It was the first English medium school in the city. It was authorised by the Central Board of Secondary Education (CBSE) for AISSE and AISSCE.

The name of school is based on its patron saint, St. Francis Xavier.

History 

To establish a Jesuit school in Alwar district, in Year 1989 Delhi Society of Jesus and on offer of RIICO to provide land in newly established Behror industrial area, School was established in Behror. The Foundation Stone was laid by Richard Pereira a veteran educationist, on 12 January 1991. On 15 July 1991, St. Xavier's School was officially started in rented accommodation in the Yadav Dharamshala, Behror, in collaboration with the Congregation of the Missionary Sisters of Ajmer (MSA)  under Sisters - Sheela, Charlotte, Annie Kujur. Initially it with Fr.George Karakunnel, SJ as Manager, and Sr. Charlotte as the Headmistress, had only two classes: Lower Kindergarten ( 26 students) and Upper Kindergarten (29 students). On 4 January 1993 classes were shifted to the new school premises in RIICO Industrial area.

K.P George from January 2000 was the first principal of the school and Sr. Marilyn MSA as the first vice-principal from July 2001.

In 2000 with the up-gradation of the school into a secondary level allowed by Board of Education Rajasthan, the school got affiliation with the CBSE for AISSE.

See also 

 Alwar
 List of Jesuit schools

References

External links 
 Official Website
 Delhi Jesuits

Education in Alwar district
Christian schools in Rajasthan
1991 establishments in Rajasthan
Educational institutions established in 1991
Jesuit primary schools in India
Jesuit secondary schools in India